Early church historians, writers, and fathers testified to the numerous Copt martyrs. Tertullian, 3rd century North African lawyer wrote "If the martyrs of the whole world were put on one arm of the balance and the martyrs of Egypt on the other, the balance will tilt in favor of the Copts." Despite periods of martyrdom and persecution the number of believers continued to grow and the lives of the martyrs inspired many to the Christian faith.

The following is a list of saints commemorated by the Coptic Orthodox Church of Alexandria. The majority of saints are from Egypt with the majority venerated in all of Christianity.



Alphabetical list of Christian Saints in the Coptic Orthodox Church of Alexandria

Aaron, the high priest, and brother of Moses 
Ababius, monk of Scetes
Abadiu, bishop and martyr of Ansena
Abakir, John, the 3 Virgins and their Mother, martyrs from Alexandria
Abakragoun, martyr 
Abāmūn of Tarnūt, martyr
Abāmūn of Tukh, martyr
Abanoub, the child martyr 
Abanoub, confessor
Abanoub of The Golden Fan
Abaskhayroun, the soldier, martyr from Qallin
Abdel Messih El-Habashi, Ethiopian monk of the Paromeos Monastery 
Abdel Messih El-Makari, 20th-century monk of the Monastery of St. Marcarius
Abib and Apollo, 4th-century monks from Akhmim
Abraam, abbot of El-Muharraq Monastery, bishop of Fayoum and Giza, noted for his devotion to the poor
Abraam Anba Samuel, abbot of the Monastery of St. Thomas the Anchorite 
Abraam and George, 7th-century monks of the Monastery of St. Marcarius
Abraham, 4th-century monk and hermit of Minuf
Abraham, 4th-century monk of Scetes
Abraham, 6th-century abbot of the Monastery of St. Phoibammon, and 14th bishop of Hermonthis
Abraham of Farshut, 6th-century abbot
Abraham, the 62nd Pope of Alexandria
Abraham, the poor, the simple, monk
Abraham, the prophet
Abratacus (feast day April 16)
Acacius, bishop of Jerusalem
Acacius, patriarch of Constantinople 
Achillas, 4th-5th century monk
Achillas, the 18th Pope of Alexandria
Aesculapius and Dioscorus, 4th-century ascetes and martyrs of Akhmim
Agabus, one of the seventy disciples
Agatho, the 39th Pope of Alexandria
Agathon, Peter, John, Amun, Amuna & their mother Rebecca, 4th century martyrs from Qus
Agathon, the stylite spent ten years in Scetes and fifty years in solitude on a pillar
Agrippinus, the 10th Pope of Alexandria
Alexander, bishop of Jerusalem 
Alexander I, the 19th Pope of Alexandria
Alexander II, the 43rd Pope of Alexandria
Ambrose, theologian and confessor
Ammonius, bishop of Esna, martyr
Ammonius, founder of the Monastery of the Martyrs
Ammonius of Kellia, disciple of St. Pambo of Scetes
Amos, one of the minor twelve minor prophets
Amun, anchorite and bishop from Scetes
Anna Simone (Anasimon), the anchoress queen
Anastasia, martyr 
Anastasia the Patrician
Anastasius, the 36th Pope of Alexandria
Andrew, the apostle and brother of St. Peter
Andrianus, the martyr
Andronicus, the 37th Pope of Alexandria
Anianus, the 2nd Pope of Alexandria
Anne (Hannah), the mother of the Theotokos
Anthony the Great, father of monasticism
Apakir
Apali, martyr and son of St. Justus and St. Theoclia
Apollonia, virgin martyr 
Apollo of Bawit, native of Akhmim, founder of the Monastery of St. Apollo at Bawit
Apollos
Apraxios, native of Upper Egypt, became a monk at twenty and lived until seventy
Archiledes
Ari, priest of Shatanouf
Arianus, Governor of Ansena who repented after martyring many Christians
Aristobulus, one of the Seventy Apostles
Arsenius, slave of St. Sousnyous
Arsenius, tutor of Arcadius & Honorius, the sons of Emperor Theodosius the Great
Athanasius, metropolitan of Beni Suef and El-Bahnasa
 Athanasius I, the Apostolic, the 20th Pope of Alexandria
Athanasius II, the 28th Pope of Alexandria
Athanasius III, the 76th Pope of Alexandria
Athanasius and his sister Irene, martyrs
Athenagoras, the Athenian, apologist, and philosopher 
Avghanistos, martyr and soldier of The Martyr St. Arianus The Governor of Ansena
Avilius, the 3rd Pope of Alexandria
Awgin, father of Monasticism in Mesopotamia

B

Babnuda, the anchorite, martyr 
Balamon, the anchorite
Barbara and Juliana, martyrs
Barsanuphius, monk, martyr during the Islamic occupation of Egypt
Barnabas, one of the seventy apostles
Bartholomew, one of the twelve apostles
Bashnouna, monk, martyr during the Islamic occupation of Egypt in 1164
Basil, bishop of Caesarea
Basilides and Potamiana, martyrs
Basilissa, the child martyr
Basilius, metropolitan of Jerusalem 
Basin and her Children
Benjamin I, the 38th Pope of Alexandria
Benjamin II, the 82nd Pope of Alexandria
Bessarion, disciple of St. Anthony the Great and later St. Macarius the Great
Bisada, the priest, martyr
Bishoy Kamel, the hegumen
Butamina, the chaste virgin, martyr

C

Candidus, commander of the Theban Legion
Cassius and Florentius, members of the Theban Legion
Catherine of Alexandria, virgin martyr 
Celadion, the 9th Pope of Alexandria
Chiaffredo, member of the Theban Legion
Christoldoulos, the 66th Pope of Alexandria
Chrysanthus and Daria, martyrs
Clement of Alexandria, the 5th Dean of Catechetical School of Alexandria
Cleopas, the apostle and bishop of Jerusalem
Cleopatra
Colluthus, of Antinoöpolis, martyr
Constantine, the Emperor of the Roman Empire
Cosmas I, the 44th Pope of Alexandria
Cosmas II, the 54th Pope of Alexandria
Cosmas III, the 58th Pope of Alexandria
Cosmas and Damian, martyrs
Cyprian and Justina, martyrs
Cyracuse and Julietta
Cyril, bishop of Jerusalem
Cyril I, the 24th Pope of Alexandria
Cyril II, the 67th Pope of Alexandria 
Cyril III, the 75th Pope of Alexandria
Cyril IV, the 110th Pope of Alexandria
Cyril V, the 112th Pope of Alexandria
Cyril VI, the 116th Pope of Alexandria
Cyrus and John, unmercenary physicians, wonderworkers, martyrs

D
Dabamon

Damian, the 35th Pope of Alexandria
Daniel, the hegumen of Scetes during the 6th-century 
Daniel, the prophet
Dasya, the soldier, 3rd-century martyr from Tanda
David, the prophet and king
Demetrius I, the 12th Pope of Alexandria
Demetrius II, the 111th Pope of Alexandria
Demiana and the 40 Virgins,
Didymus the Blind, the 15th Dean of Catechetical School of Alexandria
Dionysius, the 14th Pope of Alexandria 
Dioscorus I, the 25th Pope of Alexandria
Dioscorus II, the 31st Pope of Alexandria
Dorothea of Alexandria, virgin martyr

E
Elias and four companions,  martyrs
Elijah, the prophet
Elisa, the anchorite
Elisha, the prophet
Elizabeth, the mother of John the Baptist
Epimachus of Pelusium, martyr 
Epiphanius of Salamis, bishop of Cyprus, spent most of his monastic life in Egypt
Erastus, the apostle
Esther, Queen of Persia
Esther of Akhmim, martyr 
Eudokia, martyr 
Eugenius, Eugander, and Abilandius
Eumenes, the 7th Pope of Alexandria
Euphrasia, the virgin, moved to Egypt to join a Monastery of Nuns near Alexandria
Eusebius, the historian, bishop of Caesarea
Eusignius, the soldier, martyr 
Eutychus, the disciple of St. John the Evangelist
Ezekiel, the prophet
Ezekiel, the anchorite, disciple St. Paul of Tamouh

F

Faltaous, martyr
Faltaous El-Souriani, the desert eagle, 21st-century monk
Fana, the hermit, founder of Monastery of Saint Fana 
Faustus, Abibus and Dionysius of Alexandria, martyrs 
Febronia, the ascetic, virgin, martyr 
Felix the Pope of Rome
Felix and Regula, members of the Theban Legion
Freig (Tegi or Ruwais), 15th-century Egyptian

G

Gabriel I, the 57th Pope of Alexandria
Gabriel II, the 70th Pope of Alexandria
Gabriel III, the 78th Pope of Alexandria
Gabriel IV, the 86th Pope of Alexandria
Gabriel V, the 88th Pope of Alexandria
Gabriel VI, the 91st Pope of Alexandria
Gabriel VII, the 95th Pope of Alexandria
Gabriel VIII, the 97th Pope of Alexandria
Bishop Gabriel Abdel El-Metgaly, Bishop and martyr
Gallicanus, bishop of Pelusium, martyr
Gallicanus, martyr 
Gelasius, monk of Shiheet
George, the ascetic
George, the prince of martyrs 
George of Alexandria, martyr 
George El Mozahem, martyr during the Islamic occupation of Egypt in 969
 George the new martyr
Gereon, member of the Theban Legion
Ghalion, the anchorite
Gideon one of the Judges of Israel
Gregory, the ascetic
Gregory, the illuminator, patriarch of Armenia
Gregory, the theologian, bishop of Nyssa, brother of St. Basil the Great
Gregory, the wonder-worker, bishop of Neocaesarea
George, Bishop of Assiut, martyr

H

Habakkuk, one of the minor twelve minor prophets
Habib Girgis, dean of Catechetical School of Alexandria
Hadid, the priest
Haggai, one of the minor twelve minor prophets
Hannah, the prophetess, mother of Samuel the prophet
Hedra, the anchorite, bishop of Aswan
Helena, empress, built numerous churches in Egypt
Hepatius, bishop of Gangra
Heraclas, the 13th Pope of Alexandria
Heraclides, the martyr
Hermina, the anchorite
Hezekiah, the king
Hilaria, daughter of Emperor Zeno, lived disguised as a monk
Hilarion, the anchorite of Palestine 
Hor, the ascetic, disciple of St. Pachomius 
Hor, Besoy, and Daydara, martyr 
Hor and Susia and their children, and Agathon the hermit, martyrs at Tamouh
Hosea, one of the minor twelve minor prophets
Hour and his mother Theodora, martyrs
Hour El-Siriakousy, martyr

I

Ibrahim, the anchorite
Ibrahim El-Gohary, formal prime minister of Egypt, built numerous churches 
Ignatius, patriarch of Antioch, martyr
Irene, daughter of a pagan king
Irini, the abbess of St. Mercurius Convent in Old Cairo 
Isaac, the 41st Pope of Alexandria
Isaac of Hourin
Isaac of Nineveh (i.e. Isaac the Syrian)
Isaac of Scetes, the disciple of St. Apollo
Isaac of Tiphre
Isaac, the hermit
Isaac, the priest of El-Qalali
Isaiah, the prophet
Isidore, friend of Sina the soldier, martyr 
Isidore of Scété (died c. 390) Egyptian priest and desert ascetic
Isidore of Pelusium, ascetic and scholar, relative of Theophilus of Alexandria and Cyril of Alexandria, the father of confession of Moses the Black

J

James, the 50th Pope of Alexandria
Jacob of Nisibis, bishop of Nisibis, spiritual father of St. Ephrem the Syrian
James, the apostle and martyr, brother of John the Apostle
James, the apostle and martyr, son of Alphaeus
James, the ascetic
James, bishop of Cairo
James of Manug
James, bishop of Jerusalem
Jeremiah, the prophet
Jerome, the priest, theologian, and historian
Joachim, the grandfather of Christ
Joel, one of the minor twelve minor prophets
John I, the 29th Pope of Alexandria
John II, the 30th Pope of Alexandria
John III, the 40th Pope of Alexandria
John IV, the 48th Pope of Alexandria
John V, the 72nd Pope of Alexandria
John VI, the 74th Pope of Alexandria
John VII, the 77th Pope of Alexandria
John VIII, the 80th Pope of Alexandria
John IX, the 81st Pope of Alexandria
John X, the 85th Pope of Alexandria
John XI, the 89th Pope of Alexandria
John XII, the 93rd Pope of Alexandria
John XIII, the 94th Pope of Alexandria
John XIV, the 96th Pope of Alexandria
John XV, the 99th Pope of Alexandria
John XVI, the 103rd Pope of Alexandria
John XVII, the 105th Pope of Alexandria
John XVIII, the 107th Pope of Alexandria
John XIX, the 113th Pope of Alexandria
John, 7th-century hegumen of Scetes 
John, the forerunner, baptist and martyr 
John, bishop of El-Borollos, who gathered the Synaxarion
John, bishop of Nikiu 
John, the evangelist
John Chrysostom,  the golden month 
John Colobos, the short, one of the desert fathers
John of Egypt, the anchorite 
John Kame, the priest 
John of Patmos, the author of the Book of Revelation
John of Senhout, martyr 
John of Qalyub, monk from the monastery of St. Pishoy, and martyr 
Jonah, one of the minor twelve minor prophets
Joseph, the 52nd Pope of Alexandria
Joseph II, the 115th Pope of Alexandria
Julian, the 11th Pope of Alexandria
Julietta, martyr 
Julius of Aqfahs, the martyr and author of the biography of martyrs
Justus, the 6th Pope of Alexandria
Justus, disciple of St. Samuel The Confessor
Justus, martyr, husband of St. Theoclia, and father of St. Apali

K
Karas, the anchorite of Scetes, brother of Emperor Theodosius the Great
Karas, first bishop of the United States
Kaou, martyr 
Keriakos, the anchorite
Kedron, the 4th Pope of Alexandria
Kloug, physician, ascetic, priest, and martyr 
Kosheh Martyrs, martyrs during the Islamic occupation of Egypt in 2000

L
 Latsoun, the anchorite, native of El Bahnasa
 Lazarus of Bethany, the beloved of the Lord
 Lazarus, Salomi, his wife and their children, martyr
 Leonides of Alexandria, martyr, father of Origen
 Longinus, abbot of Ennaton monastery in Alexandria
 Longinus, Roman soldier who pierced Jesus Christ in his side on the cross
 Lucas I, bishop of Manfalut and Abnub
 Lucas II, bishop of Manfalut and Abnub
 Lucilianus and four others with him.
 Luke, one of the four evangelists

M

Macarius I, the 59th Pope of Alexandria
Macarius II, the 69th Pope of Alexandria
Macarius III, the 114th Pope of Alexandria
Macarius of Alexandria, the abbot of the Coptic Monasteries 
Macarius, bishop of Edkow (Tkoou), martyr
Macarius of Egypt, lamp of the desert, founder of several monasteries, including the Monastery of St. Macarius
Malachi, one of the minor twelve minor prophets
Malati, martyr during the Islamic occupation of Egypt in 1803 
Marina, the monk
Mark I, the apostle, evangelist, martyr, author of the Gospel of Mark, and the 1st Pope of Alexandria
Mark II, the 49th Pope of Alexandria
Mark III, the 73rd Pope of Alexandria
Mark IV, the 84th Pope of Alexandria
Mark V, the 98th Pope of Alexandria
Mark VI, the 101st Pope of Alexandria
Mark VII, the 106th Pope of Alexandria
Mark VIII, the 108th Pope of Alexandria
Markianos, the 8th Pope of Alexandria
Martha of Egypt, formerly a prostitute, she became an ascetic and lived for 25 years in the wilderness
Mary, the ascetic, the shut-in
Mary of Egypt, the anchorite
Mary Magdalene
Margaret the Virgin, virgin-Martyr and Vanquisher of Demons
Maspero Martyrs, killed in 2011
Matra, martyr from Alexandria
Matruna, the martyr
Matthew, the apostle, evangelist, and martyr 
Matthew I, the 87th Pope of Alexandria
Matthew II, the 90th Pope of Alexandria
Matthew III, the 100th Pope of Alexandria
Matthew IV, the 102nd Pope of Alexandria
Matthew the Poor, 20th-century monk, theologian, and author of 181 books
Matthias, apostle 
St. Maurice, commander of the Theban Legion
Maximus, the 15th Pope of Alexandria
Maximus and Domatius, monks of Paromeos Monastery, disciples of Macarius of Egypt
Melitina, the virgin and martyr
Menas, the martyr and wonder-worker
Menas, of Akhmim, monk and martyr during the Islamic occupation of Egypt
Mercurius, the Saint with two swords
Mercurius and Ephraem, monks, martyrs
Memnon,  Wonder worker and saint
Micah, one of the minor twelve minor prophets
Michael, bishop of Naqadah
Michael I, the 46th Pope of Alexandria
Michael II, the 53rd Pope of Alexandria
Michael III, the 56th Pope of Alexandria
Michael IV, the 68th Pope of Alexandria
Michael V, the 71st Pope of Alexandria
Michael VI, the 92nd Pope of Alexandria
Michael at-Tukhi, martyr during the Islamic occupation of Egypt in 1837
Mikhail Ibrahim, the priest
Mikhaeil, metropolitan of Asyut
Mina Ava-Mina, the bishop and first abbot the Monastery of St. Mina, disciple of St. Cyril VI
Mina, bishop of Tamai (Thmoui)
Mina I, the 47th Pope of Alexandria
Mina II, the 61st Pope of Alexandria
Misael, the anchorite of the Monastery of St. Samuel the Confessor
Mohrael, child martyr 
Moisis (Moses), bishop of Ouseem
Moura, martyr
Moses, the prophet, former prince of Egypt
Moses the Black, the strong, once a robber, he was converted and joined the monks under St. Isidore in the Wadi el-Natrun
Mousa, the anchorite

N
Nag Hammadi Martyrs
Nahum, one of the minor twelve minor prophets
Narcissus, bishop of Jerusalem
Nehroua of Fayyum, martyr 
Nicanor, one of the seven deacons
Nicholas, bishop of Myra
Nilus of Sinai
Noub, the Confessor

O

Obadiah, one of the minor twelve minor prophets
Olaghi, the anchorite
Onesimus, the disciple of St. Paul
Onesiphorus, one of the seventy apostles 
Onuphrius, the anchorite, one of the desert fathers (also called, Abba Nofer)
Or, the bishop 
Otimus, the priest

P

Pakhom, the father of cenobitic monasticism (i.e. of the Koinonia)
Pa’esia (Athanasia) of Minuf
Pambo, one of the desert father
Pantaenus, the 4th Dean of Catechetical School of Alexandria
Pantaleon, the physician and martyr 
Paphnutius, 10th-century bishop
Paphnutius, the anchorite, disciple of St. Macarius of Egypt
Paphnutius, bishop of Thebaid
Philomena, Virgin, Martyr
Parsoma, the "naked"
Patapios, Desert Father, Hermit
Paul, the Apostle
Paul of Tamouh, 4th-century hermit
Paul of Thebes, the first anchorite, the first hermit 
Paul the Simple, disciple of Anthony the Great
Peter, the brother of Andrew the Apostle
Peter I, the 17th Pope of Alexandria
Peter II, the 21st Pope of Alexandria
Peter III, the 27th Pope of Alexandria
Peter IV, the 34th Pope of Alexandria
Peter V, the 82nd Pope of Alexandria
Peter VI, the 104th Pope of Alexandria
Peter VII, the 109th Pope of Alexandria
Peter Elrahawy, bishop of Gaza
Philemon, the priest
Philip, one of the twelve apostles
Philip, one of the seven deacons
Philogonus, patriarch of Antioch
Philotheos, the 63rd Pope of Alexandria
Philotheos, martyr during the Islamic occupation of Egypt in 1380
Philoxenous
Phoebammon (Aba-Fam), the soldier, martyr from Awsim
Pigol, founder of the White Monastery
Pijimi, the anchorite, one of the desert fathers 
Pisentios
Pishay, founder of the Red Monastery
Pishoy, the righteous and perfect man, the beloved of our good savior, the star of the desert
Pisora, the bishop of Masil, martyr 
Poemen, one of the desert fathers at Scetes 
Porphyrius, bishop of Gaza
Primus, the 5th Pope of Alexandria
Prochorus, one of the seven deacons
Prophorius (Porphyrius), jester martyred by Emperor Julian the Apostate after a mock baptism he refused to disown
Protus and Hyacinth, martyrs 
Psote, bishop of Ebsay

Q
Qozman El-Tahawy, martyr 
Quartus, one of the Seventy Disciples
Quarshenoufa (Warshenofius), martyr

R
Rais, martyr
Rebecca and her five children Agathon, Peter, John, Amun, & Amuna 
Rhipsime, Gaiana, and her sisters the virgins

S

Salib, martyr during the Islamic occupation of Egypt
Samson, one of the judges of Israel
Samuel the Confessor, abbot of the El-Qualamon Monastery
 Samuel the Prophet
Sana the soldier
Sarah, the nun of Upper Egypt
Sarah, one of the Desert Mother
Sarah and her two Sons, martyr 
Sarapamon, archpriest of the Monastery St. John the Dwarf
Sarapamon, bishop of Niku
Sarapamon, the veiled, bishop of El-Monufia
Savories
Serapion, bishop of Thmuis, disciple of St. Anthony the Great and St. Athanasius the Apostolic
Serapion, the monk
Sergius and Bacchus, martyrs
Severianus, bishop of Gabala
Severus, bishop of Ashmunein, historian
Severus, patriarch of Antioch
Shenouda, the Archimandrite, abbot of the White Monastery 
Shenouda I, the 55th Pope of Alexandria
Shenouda II, the 65th Pope of Alexandria
Shenouda III, the 117th Pope of Alexandria
Sidhom Bishay, martyr during the Islamic occupation of Egypt in 1844
Silas, the anchorite
Silvanus of Scetes, friend of St. Macarius the Great
Simeon I, the 42nd Pope of Alexandria
Simeon II, the 51st Pope of Alexandria
Simeon, of Menouf, martyr during the Islamic occupation of Egypt
Simon, the apostle and martyr 
Simon, the stylite
Simon, the tanner, he moved the Mokattam mountain 
Sina, the soldier, martyr
Sinouti el-Bahnasa, martyr
Sisoes the Great, one of the desert fathers
Sophia of Egypt, martyr
Sousenyos, martyr 
Stephanos, the anchorite of the wilderness of Fayoum 
Stephen, the archdeacon, protomartyr
Stephen, the priest & Niketa the martyr
Stratios, the anchorite

T

 Tamada and her children, and Armenius and his mother
Tekle Haymanot, the Ethiopian
Thecla, the martyr
Theoclia, martyr
Theodora and Didymus, martyrs 
Theodora, 4th-century nun at the convent near Alexandria
Theodora, chaste virgin martyr
Theodora, the monk
Theodore, disciple of St. Pakhomius
Theodore the Martyr
Theban Legion, is entire Roman legion of 6666 men
Theodore, the prince of Mishreke
Theodore, the prince of Shotb
Theodoros I, the 45th Pope of Alexandria
Theodorus, disciple of St. Pachomius
Theodosius I, the 33rd Pope of Alexandria
Theodosius II, the 79th Pope of Alexandria
Theognosta, the virgin 
Theonas, the 16th Pope of Alexandria
Theophilus I, the 23rd Pope of Alexandria
Theophilus II, the 60th Pope of Alexandria
Theophilus, the monk of the Ennaton monastery near Alexandria
Theophilus, the bishop of Akhmim
Theophilus & His Wife, martyr in Fayyum
Theopista, took it upon herself to become a nun and honored with the holy Eskeem
Theotokos, the pure, full of glory, ever-virgin, Saint Mary, who in truth, gave birth to God the Logos 
Thomas, the apostle and martyr 
Thomas, the anchorite of Shinshif
Thomas, Victor, & Isaac, of the city of Ashmunein
Timon, one of the seven deacons
Timothy, the anchorite
Timothy, the apostle, bishop, and martyr
Timothy, bishop of Ansena
Timothy I, the 22nd Pope of Alexandria
Timothy II, the 26th Pope of Alexandria
Timothy III, the 32nd Pope of Alexandria
Titus, the apostle, and disciple of St. Paul

V
Varus, the soldier and martyr
Verena, associated with the Theban Legion
Veronica, a young girl from the monastery of virgins near Akhmim, martyr during the Islamic occupation of Egypt in 749
Victor, the soldier, from Asyut, martyr 
Vizier Abu Elaala Fahd ibn Ibrahim, martyr during the Islamic occupation of Egypt

W
Wadamoun, first martyr in Upper Egypt
Wanas, boy deacon from Luxor, martyr
Wissa, disciple of St. Shenouda

Y
Yostos El Antony, the silent monk
Yostos, the bishop and martyr
Yousab, the anchorite, native of Qift
Yousab El Abah, the theologian, bishop of Girga and Akhmim
Youstina, the martyr

Z
Zacharias, the 64th Pope of Alexandria
Zacharias, bishop of Sakha
Zacharias, the perfect monk of Scetes
Zadok, and the 128 saints with him martyred in Persia
Zechariah, the priest and martyr 
Zechariah, one of the minor twelve minor prophets
Zephaniah, one of the minor twelve minor prophets
Zosimas of Palestine, 5th-century anchorite

Archangels
 Michael	
 Gabriel	
 Raphael	
 Suriel (disputedly Uriel or Sariel)
 Sedakiel
 Sarathiel	
 Ananiel

Groups of martyrs
7 Martyrs on the Mount of St. Anthony
12 Martyrs of Naqlun
21 Martyrs of Libya
49 Martyrs of Shiheet
150 Men and 24 Women from Ansena
400 Martyrs in Dendera
3,600 Martyrs of Esna
6,600 Egyptian Soldiers of the Theban Legion
8,140 Martyrs in Akhmim
144,000 Children of Bethlehem

References 
Atiya, Aziz S. The Coptic Encyclopedia. New York: Macmillan Publishing Co., 1991. 

Saints

Saints

Lists of saints